Flagler Estates is an unincorporated community in Flagler and St. Johns counties in the U.S. state of Florida. The Flagler County portion of Flagler Estates is part of the Deltona–Daytona Beach–Ormond Beach, FL metropolitan statistical area, while the St. Johns County portion is part of the Jacksonville Metropolitan Statistical Area. As of May 2006, there were an estimated 1,500 families residing in Flagler Estates.

Location

The main entrance is off State Road 13, onto Flagler Estates Boulevard.

Although Flagler Estates cover a wide area, the nearest services are in Palatka, across the St. Johns River. The main river that flows through the central area is Deep Creek.  east of the area is Old Brick Road, a U.S. National Register of Historic Place. The area is known for its large lot sizes.

Government jurisdiction

Prior to January 2004, the FERWCD district was located in Flagler and St. Johns counties. The Flagler County portion of the District was removed from the District Boundaries effective January 1, 2004. This de-annexation was codified in Chapter 2006-358, Laws of Florida. In the 2006 codification bill, lands owned by FERWCD north of the Ashley Outfall were added into the District.

Land use

The current land-uses within the District boundaries are generally  residential.  On the east side of the watershed, outside the District boundaries, the primary land-use is silviculture.  On the west side of the watershed, outside the District boundaries, the primary land-use is agricultural.  In the Flagler County portion of the watershed, the land-use is mixed between silviculture, agriculture, and wetland.  In this area, about 60% of the land area could be classified as wetland.

Education
It is in the St. Johns County School District.

Zoned schools include South Woods Elementary School, Gamble Rogers Middle School, and Pedro Menendez High School.

See also
The Compound
Palatka, Florida
Hastings, Florida

References

External links
Forums, listings, news, etc.
Community News Site
Official Flagler Estates Road and Water Control District Site

Unincorporated communities in Flagler County, Florida
Unincorporated communities in St. Johns County, Florida
Census-designated places in the Jacksonville metropolitan area
Unincorporated communities in Florida
Census-designated places in Florida